Joie Davidow is an author and editor best known as co-founder of L.A. Weekly and L.A. Style magazines, and for her memoir Marked for Life.

Davidow was born in Philadelphia, United States, to a Romanian Jewish mother and Russian Jewish father, and grew up in New Jersey. She was one of the founders of the L.A. Weekly, a newspaper  in Los Angeles, which has been publishing since December 1978. In 1985 she launched the monthly magazine L.A. Style, covering topics from fashion, interior design and architecture to food and travel.

Davidow is the author of Marked for Life (published by Harmony), a memoir about living with a facial port wine stain. With Esmeralda Santiago, she edited two story anthologies, Las Mamis and Las Christmas (published by Vintage). She is also the author of Infusions of Healing: A Treasury of Mexican-American Healing (published by Fireside). Her historical novel, An Unofficial Marriage, the story of the indominitable love of the Russian author Ivan Turgenev for opera singer Pauline Viardot, was published by Arcade, March 2021. 

Davidow was a founder and editor of a weekly online magazine, "In Rome Now: Beyond the Guidebooks" and makes her home in Umbria, Italy, where she continues to write and teach.

Early life 
Davidow grew up in the small town of Millville, New Jersey, where both her parents were lawyers. She has two siblings, Jacqueline and Julianne Davidow. She graduated from the University of Pennsylvania with a major in music, then earned a Master of Music degree from the New England Conservatory. Aspiring to be an opera singer, she went to Rome, Italy to study with Maestro Luigi Ricci, at that time in his 90s, who was a coach at the Opera di Roma when Puccini premiered his operas there.

Los Angeles 
Davidow moved to Los Angeles, where she co-founded the alternative weekly newspaper, L.A. Weekly, with Jay Levin, a former investigative reporter for the New York Post whom she had known in New York. In 1985, on the heels of the success of the L.A. Weekly, she founded a spin-off magazine, L.A. Style, chronicling the aesthetic of Los Angeles. In 1988, L.A.Style was sold to American Express Publishing. Unhappy with the corporate conversion of what had been an independent publication, Davidow resigned her position as executive publisher and editor-in-chief in January, 1992. The magazine folded nine months later.

In 1995, with colleague Eileen Rosaly, Davidow founded Sí magazine, catering to English-speaking Americans of Latino descent. However, major advertisers remained unconvinced that the Latino market was significant, and the magazine folded in 1997. Davidow subsequently teamed with author Esmeralda Santiago to edit two volumes of memoir, Las Christmas: Favorite Latino Authors Share Their Holiday Memories and Las Mamis: Favorite Latino Authors Remember their Mothers (both published by Vintage), featuring the work of the many authors who were featured in Sí magazine.

Rome 
Davidow spent part 2000–2001 in Rome, Italy, completing her memoir, Marked for Life, which was published by Harmony in 2003. In 2005, she moved to Rome, where, with colleague Vikki Ericks, she founded the weekly online magazine InRomeNow.com.  She currently teaches creative writing workshops and works as a freelance book editor.

Books
 Joie Davidiow, An Unofficial Marriage, Arcade 2021 {ISBN|978-1950691784}}
 Joie Davidow, I Wouldn't Leave Rome to Go to Heaven 2008 
 Joie Davidow, Marked for Life, Harmony 2003, 
 Esmeralda Santiago and Joie Davidow, Las Mamis, Knopf 2000, 
 Joie Davidow, Infusions of Healing, Fireside 1999, 
 Esmeralda Santiago and Joie Davidow, Las Christmas, Knopf 1998,

References

External links
Joie Davidow's official web-site

Year of birth missing (living people)
Living people
American businesspeople
American people of Romanian-Jewish descent
American people of Russian-Jewish descent
Editors of California newspapers
Writers from Philadelphia